Ladi may refer to
Ladi (given name)
Barkin Ladi, a local government area in Nigeria
Aliabad-e Ladi, a village in Iran
Hoseynabad Ladi, a village in Iran
Kahnok Ladi, a village in Iran
Tohman-e Ladi, a village in Iran 
Y Ladi Wen ("the White Lady"), a Celtic mythology apparition
Ladi6 (born Karoline Tamati in 1982), a recording artist from New Zealand